The 2008–09 UEFA Futsal Cup was the 23rd edition of Europe's premier club futsal tournament and the 8th edition under the current UEFA Futsal Cup format.

Teams

Preliminary round

Group A
Palacium, Villeneuve d'Ascq–

Group B
Eisstadion, Hart bei Graz–

Gruppo C
Winter Palace Sport Hall–Sofia

Group D
S.Darius & S.Girenas Sport Center, Kaunas–

Group E
Pasila Sport Hall, Helsinki–

Group F
Sport Halle Am Berg Fidel, Münster–

Main round

Group 1
Pljevlja–

Group 2
Gliwice–

Group 3
Odorheiu Secuiesc–

Group 4
Debrecen–

Group 5
Chrudim–

Group 6
Nakhchivan–

Elite round

Group A

Group B

Group C

Group D

Final four

Semifinal

Final 3rd and 4th

Final
The 2009 UEFA Futsal Cup Final was played at 17:00 CET on 26 April 2009 at the Palace of Sports in Yekaterinburg, Russia. Inter FS won the match 5–1.

References

External links
 Official UEFA Futsal Cup website

UEFA Futsal Champions League
Cup